William Landsberg House is a historic home located on a hill in a wooded area of Port Washington in Nassau County, New York.  It was designed by architect William Landsberg for himself and his family.

The rectangular house with a flat roof features vertical cypress panels which cover the garage and second story, which cantilevers over the first story by 3 feet on the north and south sides. Custom-sized large windows, a few of which are floor to ceiling, ornament the facades creating an open feeling in the living and dining room.

The house was modified in 1962–1963 to add nine feet, allowing expansion of the kitchen and living room; the rear porch was also replaced with the current stone patio.  The house has been unchanged since then. Landsberg lived in the house until his death in 2013. The Landsberg house is considered a significant example of Modernist Architecture created in the United States, and as such was added to the National Register of Historic Places on August 18, 2014.

Landsberg was not well known nationally, but was active on the east coast and particularly on Long Island.  He was a graduate student at Harvard under Walter Gropius and Marcel Breuer, and worked professionally with both men during his career.

References

External links
 For Sale: home of architect William Landsberg, Design Within Reach blog
 TKS Historic Resources, Inc., Significance Analysis for 238 East Broadway, Roslyn, NY (PDF), P.11.

Houses on the National Register of Historic Places in New York (state)
Houses in Nassau County, New York
National Register of Historic Places in North Hempstead (town), New York